Story of Seasons, known in Japan as , is a farming simulation video game developed by Marvelous Entertainment for the Nintendo 3DS. It was released in Japan on February 27, 2014, and in North America on March 31, 2015. This was the first game not under the Harvest Moon franchise title in North America due to Natsume's ownership of the name.

The game follows along the same lines as the rest of the series, in which the player takes on the role of a farmer. The player can choose to play as a boy or girl farmer and choose between two difficulties at the beginning of the game. The difficulty can not be changed once chosen by the player. There are a variety of things to do in the game such as producing crops and raising livestock. The game also introduces new characters, including a tiny goddess and a tiny witch.

Story
The player is bored with their regular life and receives a flyer announcing the need for farmers in Oak Tree Town. Deciding to risk it all, the player moves to the small village. There are four other farmers living in Oak Tree Town, who will teach the player how to run their new farm. The ultimate goal is to unlock all seven vendors by fulfilling certain requirements and make Oak Tree Town a renowned international trade city. Large variety of seeds, items, buildings, and animals become available through unlocking the vendors. Together the NPC farmers and the player will help each other become successful.

Gameplay
The main feature of the game is connectivity according to Yoshifumi Hashimoto, the producer of the Story of Seasons series. Players sell their crop and dairy products to other countries in the game via a Trade Station. Some countries prefer one type of item over another, and may have to travel to the other countries to make deliveries. Personal farm data can be swapped with other players using StreetPass.

Character customization is back from Harvest Moon: A New Beginning. The player can control his or her hair style and color, eyes, skin color, hats, glasses, clothing outfits, and up to three accessories.

Farming has been simplified to the 3x3 field. Sowing, watering, and harvesting can now be done to the entire 3x3 field instead of one at a time.  This allows the player to care for more fields in less time. Crops do not carry over to the next season like they did in A New Beginning; once the first of the next season rolls around, all crops from the previous season that are still growing will be wilted and dead.

The player can set up a wildlife Safari, housing a variety of exotic animals such as monkeys and parrots. The Safari will be toured by the other villagers, similar to the Garden Tour in A New Beginning. The exotic animals are added through the Safari through unlocking them from vendors in the game through having good relations with them. Other animals the player can only keep by meeting certain conditions. If the player becomes friendly with the animals through interaction they will be able to keep more animals in the Safari. Farm animals that are brought and taken care of within the Safari become happier and less stressed. In the Safari there is a mine where rare gems and minerals can be found through use of the hammer tool.

This game brought a new concept of in-game rival farmers and conquests. The player can compete with their rival farmers for more land within the game to plant crops. There are multiple lands and players compete through three different competitions, which are the following: seasonal festivals, amount of items shipped, and amount of money earned from shipping items. After winning players can rent the field for a temporary amount of time, until their time is up and they are challenged by the other farmers for the field if they do not renew in time.

Along with other games of the series this game brings back the dating mechanic, which includes six marriage candidates for the player to choose from. Getting married does not affect the storyline and does not unlock anything but the spouse does offer to forage for items after marriage. Marriage candidates depend on the gender of the character the player chose at the start. To get married, the player must raise friendship with the candidate, view all four flower events that are triggered through being at a specific friendship level (or higher) and setting, as well as upgrade their house size and give them a blue feather. The player can view two of the events before needing to get a commitment ring as a signal that they are dating in order to continue to view the other two events. After giving the candidate the ring the player is not allowed to view events for the other candidates.

Also in this game are combos. Equipping certain groupings of items such as rings, necklaces, and earrings can restore stamina and health to the player. There are combinations of items that can be placed in town that could increase prices that players can sell their items at, as well as combinations of items that will decrease the amount of time needed to create items.

Multiplayer
Unlocked on Spring 26 Year 1, players can do multiplayer over Local connection or Internet, and with "Anyone" or "Friends", the latter required all parties have their 3DS friend codes registered in each other's system. Players can create a room for three visitors at most or search for an open room in the Multiplayer menu. Players opening their farms must prepare three gifts for each visitor, and players who search for farms to visit also need to prepare a gift for the host. The number of gifts ranges from one and five, depending on the type of item. There are some non-tradeable items, including rare materials such as orichalcum and platinum; golden or plus products; some clothes and hats; etc.

During the farm visit, players are able to use a magic wand to sprinkle some magic on the host's plants and animals. The plants will receive star points, and the animals' stress levels will be reduced (however, this does not increase animals' products' star rank). Hosting a multiplayer session in this game is highly beneficial to boost the plants' star rank. Using the wand on other players will give them ability to float mid-air by pressing and holding the B button. Besides enjoying the farmland design, players can also look inside the host's house and admire the interior design.

Unlike the predecessor, A New Beginning, the multiplayer in Story of Seasons is region-locked, meaning the trading and farm visits can only be done among players from the same region. This has caused confusion and disappointment for some players in the Europe and North America regions, and this limitation is blamed for the low number of rooms in the multiplayer section.

Reception

The game received "generally favorable reviews" according to the review aggregation website Metacritic. IGN said, "Story of Seasons successfully integrates both supply-and-demand economics and personality into the farm-life sim." In Japan, Famitsu gave it a score of all four eights for a total of 32 out of 40.

The Escapist gave it four-and-a-half stars out of five, calling it "a refreshing game offering a positive place of escape, and while it is definitely a niche title, it gets everything it does right." National Post gave it a score of eight out of ten, saying that it takes the series "back to its basics." However, Metro gave it six out of ten, saying, "For better and worse this is Harvest Moon in all but name, with a few useful new ideas but still the same old crop of problems."

In March 2014, it was the top selling game in Japan, at 131,000 units sold.

In July 2015, Xseed announced that the game became their fastest-selling game ever, with over 100,000 units sold in North America.

References

External links
Marvelous AQL Inc. page 
Official website

2014 video games
Story of Seasons games
Marvelous Entertainment
Nintendo 3DS games
Nintendo 3DS eShop games
Nintendo 3DS-only games
Nintendo Network games
Video games developed in Japan
Video games featuring protagonists of selectable gender
Xseed Games games
Single-player video games